Tōkaidō may refer to:

 Taiheiyō Belt (also Tōkaidō corridor), the megalopolis in Japan extending from Ibaraki Prefecture to Fukuoka Prefecture
 Tokaido (company), a Japanese company that manufactures karate uniforms, belts, and related products
 Tōkaidō (region), a Japanese geographical term meaning both an ancient division of the country and the main road running through it
 Tokaido, a board game designed by Antoine Bauza

Transit
 Tōkaidō (road), the most important of the Five Routes of the Edo period in Japan
 Tōkaidō Main Line, a major Japanese railway line of the Japan Railways Group network
 Tokaido Shinkansen, a Japanese high-speed rail line that is part of the nationwide Shinkansen network

See also
 Tokai (disambiguation)